Loup is an extinct Algonquian language, or possibly group of languages, spoken in colonial New England. Loup ('Wolf') was a French colonial ethnographic term, and usage was inconsistent. In modern literature, it refers to two varieties, Loup A and Loup B.

Attestation
Loup A, which may be the language of the Nipmuck, is principally attested from a word list recorded from refugees by the St. Francis mission to the Abenaki in Quebec. The descendants of these refugees became speakers of Western Abenaki in the eighteenth century. Loup B refers to a second word list, which shows extensive dialectal variation. This may not be a distinct language, but just notes on the speech of various New England Algonquian refugees in French missions.

Phonology 
The phonology of Loup A (Nipmuck), reconstructed by Gustafson 2000: 

 

The vowel sounds likely have the same phonetic quality as other southern New England Algonquian languages.

References

External links 
OLAC resources in and about the Loup A language
OLAC resources in and about the Loup B language
Nipmuc Language.org

Eastern Algonquian languages
Indigenous languages of the North American eastern woodlands
Languages of the United States
Extinct languages of North America
Native American history of New York (state)
Indigenous languages of North America
Languages extinct in the 18th century
Nipmuc